William Slater (born 18 June 1983), is an Australian former professional rugby league footballer who played in the 2000s and 2010s and the current coach of the Queensland Maroons. 

An Australian international and one-time captain of the Queensland State of Origin team, he played his entire club career in the National Rugby League for the Melbourne Storm, with whom he played in seven NRL Grand Finals. Slater also set the club's record for most ever tries and NRL record for most ever tries by a fullback.

Slater amassed 190 NRL tries for the Melbourne Storm, which is the second most in an Australian first-grade career, behind Ken Irvine. Slater also won two premierships, the Clive Churchill Medal twice and the Dally M Medal with the Storm. With the Kangaroos he was the 2008 World Cup's top try-scorer and player of the tournament and won the 2008 Golden Boot Award as the World player of the year. Slater was also the winner of the television game show Australia's Greatest Athlete in 2009 and 2010.

Background
Slater was born in Nambour, Queensland, Australia on 18 June 1983. He began playing rugby league football for the Brothers club in Innisfail, Queensland. A North Queensland Cowboys fan growing up, he never made a representative side with the club. At sixteen years of age, Slater left school at Innisfail State High School and decided to follow his personal passion for thoroughbred racing, working initially in Sydney for 6 months as a roustabout for the racehorse trainer Gai Waterhouse.

Playing career

2003
Slater commenced playing for the Melbourne Storm in 2003. In Round 1 of the 2003 NRL season, Slater made his first grade NRL debut for the Melbourne Storm against the Cronulla-Sutherland Sharks at Remondis Stadium. From Rounds 4–8, Slater played in the centre position before moving back to fullback in Round 10 against the Brisbane Broncos in the Storms 36–16 loss at Queensland Sport and Athletics Centre. Slater played the rest of the year at fullback. After a stellar début season saw him crowned Dally M Rookie of the Year (although the awards that year were cancelled in protest). Slater was the Storm's highest try scorer in the 2003 NRL season with 19 tries in their 26 matches.

2004
Slater had a quiet but solid first game in QLD's 9–8 loss at ANZ Stadium. Slater retained his spot on the team for the second game of the series at Suncorp Stadium. In game two, just days shy of his 21st birthday, Slater was named man of the match after scoring two tries. His second try is considered one of the great individual Origin tries. Trailing 12–10, Slater latched onto a grubber kick from Darren Lockyer, chip-kicked the ball over Blues fullback Anthony Minichiello, regathering the ball and scoring in QLD's 22–18 win. Slater scored a try in the decider but could not stop a Brad Fittler inspired New South Wales side from clinching the series in QLD's 36–14 loss. Slater's club form helped his team finish 6th on the ladder, defeating the Brisbane Broncos 31–14 at Suncorp Stadium in the first game of the finals before succumbing to eventual premiers the Canterbury-Bankstown Bulldogs 43–18 at SFS. Slater played 22 matches and scored 14 tries for the Storm in the 2004 NRL season. He was named in the Kangaroo squad to tour Europe but injury prevented him from joining in the tour.

2005
Slater once again impressed in his third NRL season. Once again Slater was picked for the Queensland State of Origin team, this time at his preferred position of fullback. Slater returned for the second game in Sydney which saw the return of Andrew Johns, who spearheaded a New South Wales victory. Despite losing the match 32–22, Slater took advantage of a knock-on from the Blues Anthony Minichiello to score a length of the field try during the match. Slater was dumped from the Queensland side for the deciding third game in Brisbane which led to outrage from some Maroons fans. With injuries and suspensions, Slater had to wait three years for another chance at State of Origin. Slater continued his brilliant form throughout 2005, topping the try scoring charts with 20 tries in 21 matches for the Storm. Melbourne once again finished 6th in the league and defeated the Brisbane Broncos 24–18 at Suncorp Stadium in the first game of the finals before missing the Storms 24–16 season ending loss succumbing to an in-form North Queensland Cowboys team at SFS.

2006
Slater had a less successful 2006 season. Slater was suspended in Round 4 for seven matches for kicking Wests Tigers prop John Skandalis, but also scored two tries in the match. Injuries and suspensions kept Slater out of contention for a spot in the Queensland team in 2006. In his comeback game in Round 13 against the Sydney Roosters in the Storms 20–16 win at Olympic Park, Slater only played 25 minutes of the second half on the wing and was later found guilty of using a dangerous throw on Roosters centre Ryan Cross. Slater was suspended for 2 matches. After Slater's second suspension, Melbourne Storm coach Craig Bellamy decided to give Slater some warm up matches for his comeback into first grade with both North Sydney Bears (Melbourne's feeder club in the NSWRL Premier League) and Norths Devils (Melbourne's feeder club in the Queensland Cup). Slater made his NRL comeback in Round 18 playing his preferred fullback position when the Storm defeated the Brisbane Broncos 10–4 at Olympic Park. In Round 22 against the Wests Tigers in the Storms 46–4 win at Olympic Park, Slater was given a two match suspension for a late forearm, which was his third suspension for the season. Slater came back to the main line-up in Round 25 against the Canberra Raiders in the Storms 22–18 win at Canberra Stadium. A few weeks later, after having claimed the minor premiership the Storm again met the Brisbane Broncos, this time in the 2006 NRL Grand Final. It was Slater's first and he played at fullback in what was Melbourne's first grand final loss after succumbing 15–8 to a Broncos team in Melbourne player Scott Hill farewell NRL match before moving to the ESL. Slater played in 15 matches and scored 5 tries for the Storm in the 2006 NRL season.

2007
Slater had a quiet start to the 2007 season. In Round 8, he suffered a badly broken cheekbone against the Manly-Warringah Sea Eagles when he tried to charge down former teammate Matt Orford's kick, and collided with teammate Sam Tagataese in Melbourne's 13–12 loss at Brookvale Oval. On his return from injury in Round 17, Slater scored 8 tries from 9 appearances and became a vital cog in the back line of the Storm, setting up over 20 tries during the season. In Round 21 against the Cronulla-Sutherland Sharks at Remondis Stadium, Slater played his 100th NRL career match in the Storms 17–16 win. Slater played in 23 matches and scored 12 tries for the Storm in the 2007 NRL season. Slater won the Storms Back of the Year Award.

2008
Slater's start to the 2008 season can be described as nothing short of sensational. He scored 3 tries in Melbourne's 32–18 Round 1 win at Etihad Stadium, one at SFS in Round 3, a 10–6 loss to the Sydney Roosters and two at Olympic Park in Melbourne's 26–4 win over the Manly-Warringah Sea Eagles. After his start to the season, Slater garnered praise from league experts such as Laurie Daley and Andrew Johns as being the best player in the game. Slater's form was rewarded when he was selected at fullback for the Australian national team in the Centenary Test against New Zealand, displacing the incumbent Brett Stewart. Slater had a modest game in attack for Australia but proved his worth by making numerous try-saving tackles in Australia's 28–12 victory at SCG. Two weeks later, Slater was selected to once again represent Queensland in the 2008 State of Origin series, this time displacing incumbent, Karmichael Hunt from fullback to five-eighth, Slater had a mixed performance for Queensland throwing a few loose passes despite running over 220 metres and making a line break that nearly resulted in a try to Greg Inglis. Queensland eventually lost, 18–10. Slater returned for Game 2 but was dropped to the interchange bench before replacing Karmichael Hunt 30 minutes into the match at ANZ Stadium. In Game 2 Slater played off the interchange bench in QLD's 30–0 win in Brisbane. In Game 3, Slater once again started from the interchange bench with Karmichael Hunt starting at fullback. A broken arm to Scott Prince at the 17-minute mark forced Slater to fullback with Karmichael Hunt switching to five eighth. Slater broke the line with his first touch and kick return of the game. He was excellent under the high ball, thwarting many attacking kicks. With just 10 minutes to go, Johnathan Thurston broke the New South Wales line, drawing in the fullback before passing the ball to Slater who ran the remaining 30 metres to score the match-winning try and a 16–10 victory. It was Slater's first series win for Queensland. In Round 19, Slater was involved in an all-in brawl in a match against the St George Illawarra Dragons in the Storms 26–0 win at Olympic Park. He was sin-binned for throwing several punches at winger, Jason Nightingale. He had a two-match suspension downgraded to one match after claiming Nightingale had provoked him with several head-butts throughout the match. 

In August 2008, Slater was named in the preliminary 46-man Kangaroos squad for the 2008 World Cup. In September 2008; Slater narrowly missed out on the Dally M Medal, Player of the Year, finishing 2 points behind the Sea Eagles Matt Orford. The one-week suspension in Round 19 deducted 3 points from Slater's tally, which would have won him the medal. Days after playing in the 2008 NRL Grand Final 40–0 defeat the Manly-Warringah Sea Eagles, Slater was named the Melbourne club's Player of the Year. Slater played in 24 matches and scored 14 tries for the Storm in the 2008 NRL season. Slater capped off a brilliant year by winning the Rugby League World Golden Boot Award as the best player in the world. In 2008 he also received the Rugby League International Federation's International Player of the Year award.  In October 2008 Slater was selected in the final 24-man Australian squad but hesitated playing since he and his wife were expecting their first child. Slater went on to play fullback for Australia in the 2008 World Cup, scoring hat-tricks in matches against England (52–4 win at Etihad) & Fiji (52–0 win at SFS). Billy Slater won the Man of the match twice in tournament for his performance in both games. About midway through the second half of the World Cup final Slater, who had set up Australia's first two tries, made a grave misjudgement, Slater threw a wild pass back in field after attempting to go the short side from a kick return and it was snapped up by Benji Marshall for a gift four-pointer. Although Melbourne teammate Greg Inglis bought them back within 2 points with a try, a penalty try, courtesy of a Joel Monaghan infringement, ruled out any possible comeback. Despite his costly error and Australia losing the game 34–20 to New Zealand, Slater was named Player of the Tournament following the World Cup final in Brisbane. Slater was also the competition's top tryscorer with 7 tries.

2009
Slater was selected for Australia in the 2009 Anzac Test match at  against New Zealand at Suncorp Stadium in the Kangaroos' 38–10 redemption win over the Kiwis. In April 2009, he was named in the preliminary 25-man squad to represent Queensland in the opening State of Origin match for 2009, and was subsequently picked at fullback for the opening State of Origin match. Slater was the first try scorer in the 2009 State of Origin Series scoring in Queensland's 28–18 win in Sydney. Slater played in the other 2 matches in the Queensland's 2009 winning State of Origin team. In Round 22 against the North Queensland Cowboys at Olympic Park, Slater played 150th NRL career match in the Storms 20–8 win. Melbourne finished the season 4th on the NRL table and avenged their 2008 Grand Final loss to Manly by defeating them 40–12 in the first week of the finals at Etihad Stadium. Slater's four try haul earned him man of the match honours. Slater notched up his 100th NRL career try in Melbourne's 40–10 victory over the Brisbane Broncos in the preliminary final at Etihad Stadium, becoming only the second Melbourne player to do so after Matt Geyer.

 In the next week, the Grand Final was won by the Melbourne Storm over the Parramatta Eels 23–16. Again this was also stripped from Melbourne for systematic salary cap cheating. Slater scored a try and was judged best on ground, earning the Clive Churchill Medal. Slater was named the Storms highest tryscorer in the 2009 NRL season with 18 tries in 26 matches. The following week Slater was named Melbourne's Player of the Year making it the second consecutive year he won the award. During the off-season he was given the first 'Player of the Finals' award, presented by the Rugby League Writers' Association.
Slater topped off the season with selection for Australia in the 2009 Four Nations tournament in Europe. Slater played in the first two matches against New Zealand and then England. Slater scored three tries in Australia's 46–16 win over England in the final and also acrobatically tapped the ball back infield setting up a try for teammate, Cameron Smith.

2010

Despite Melbourne being stripped of their 2007 and 2009 premierships due to the discovery of a salary cap breach, Slater was allowed to keep his Clive Churchill Medal. Slater was also involved in Queensland's 3–0 whitewash in the 2010 State of Origin series and received the Wally Lewis Medal for player of the series. In the third match, he saved a certain try, before scoring the match-turning and winning try with five minutes remaining in Queensland's 23–18 win in Sydney. Slater played in 22 matches and scored 10 tries in the Storms drama filled 2010 NRL season. In the post season, Slater was included in the Australian 2010 Four Nations squad. Slater scored 3 tries in 3 matches, including scoring a try in the Kangaroos 16–12 Four Nations Final match loss to New Zealand at Suncorp Stadium.

2011
In Round 2 against the Gold Coast Titans at AAMI Park the Storms 40–12 win, Slater scored two where he broke the record for the number of tries scored for Melbourne Storm with 114 tries, previously held by Matt Geyer with 113 tries. Slater scored in the last 10 minutes of Game 1 in the Queensland's 16–12 win in Brisbane, and scored in the last 15 minutes of Game 3 in QLD's 34–24 series winning match in Brisbane. In Round 24 against the St George Illawarra Dragons at AAMI Park, Slater played his 200th NRL career match in the Storms 8–6 win. The Melbourne Storm won the minor premiership, but were defeated by the New Zealand Warriors 20–12 in the Preliminary Final at AAMI Park, ending Slater's season. Slater was awarded the 2011 Dally M Medal for best and fairest player of the year in the NRL. Following the awarding of the Dally M Medal, there was commentary about Slater's progress. Sports reporters Ray Warren said that he "didn't think Slater was as good a player as he had been in the past", while Andrew Johns labelled Slater as "the best fullback he has seen". After playing in 24 matches, Slater was the Storms joint highest tryscorer with 12 tries alongside Cooper Cronk and Matt Duffie in the 2011 NRL season. While on tour, Slater was named the Rugby League International Federation's International Player of the Year for the second time. Slater suffered a collarbone injury and was ruled out of the tournament after Australia's 36–20 win over England at Wembley Stadium. Slater played in 3 matches of the series.

2012
Slater started the year scoring 9 tries in 5 games, including 2 tries per game in the opening 4 rounds of the season.

For the Anzac Test, Slater was selected to play at fullback in the Kangaroos 20–12 victory against New Zealand at Eden Park. Slater was Queensland's fullback for Games 1 and 2 of the 2012 State of Origin series which saw the Maroons record winning streak extend to seven series. Slater finished the 2012 NRL season with him scoring 16 tries in 21 matches for the Storm, which made him the highest fullback try scorer in the NRL with 140 tries, going past previous holder Rhys Wesser with 129. Slater scored a try in Melbourne's 14–4 premiership victory over Canterbury-Bankstown Bulldogs, where Slater was bitten in the ear by James Graham during a scuffle. The Kangaroos won the match 18–10.

An established ambassador for Adidas, in 2012 Slater appeared as part of a promotional campaign for their F50 adizero III boots alongside Dale Thomas of Aussie Rules and European football (soccer) player David Villa.

2013
Slater scored the first try in Melbourne's 2013 World Club Challenge 18–14 win over Leeds Rhinos. Slater played all three games of the 2013 State of Origin series in which Queensland extended their record for consecutive series victories to eight. In Round 21 against the Canberra Raiders at Canberra Stadium, Slater also became the 8th player in history of the League to score 150 tries, Slater scoring 2 tries in the Storms 68–4 win. Slater was the Storm's highest tryscorer in the 2013 NRL season with 18 tries in 24 matches. In the post season, Slater was chosen in Australian 24-man squad for the 2013 World Cup which Australia won the Final against New Zealand 34–2 at Old Trafford, where Slater scored 2 tries. Slater played in 4 matches and scored 4 tries in the tournament.

2014
In Round 2 against the Penrith Panthers, Slater reached a milestone of having played 250 games for Melbourne Storm in the 18–17 win at AAMI Park. Slater played all three games of the 2014 State of Origin series in which Queensland lost the series 2–1, the first series the NSW Blues won since the 2005 series. In Round 22 against the Newcastle Knights in the Storms 32–30 loss at Hunter Stadium, Slater eclipsed Andrew Ettingshausen tryscoring record with 166 tries, Slater now currently being third in the highest tryscorer ranks. Slater finished the Storm's 2014 NRL season with him playing in 22 matches and scoring 12 tries. On 9 September 2014, Slater was selected for the Australia Kangaroos 2014 Four Nations train on squad but withdrew due to injury.

2015
Slater started the 2015 season, playing featuring in the first 5 rounds of the season. He picked up a shoulder injury in the Storm's 30–14 home game win over the Warriors, which resulted him missing the next 4 weeks of action; including the Kangaroos' Annual Trans-Tasman ANZAC Test match clash to the Kiwis, with Greg Inglis filling his Fullback position. He returned to action in round 8, producing a strong 80-minutes man-of-the-match performance against the Parramatta Eels, scoring 2 tries and producing a try-saving tackle on Semi Radradra.

Carrying a shoulder injury (not 100% fully recovered) from the Storm's Round 5 game (in April) that resulted him being ruled out the Trans-Tasman ANZAC Test, Slater featured for Queensland in Game 1 and Game 2 of the 2015 State of Origin series. After the Storms' Round 10 match against the South Sydney Rabbitohs in the 16–12 win at AAMI Park and following game 2 of the 2015 State of Origin series at the Melbourne Cricket Ground, Slater was ruled out of Origin Game 3 (the decider) and for the rest of the 2015 NRL season due to him having surgery on his troublesome injured shoulder (he originally injured in April, in Round 5). Slater's incumbent fullback position was filled by Greg Inglis for Queensland for game 3 of the Origin Decider, while Cameron Munster who had a stellar year for the Storm filled his Fullback position for the Storm. Slater finished the season with him only playing in 7 matches and scoring 2 tries for the Storm.

2016
After starting round 1 of the 2016 NRL season playing 80-minutes and producing an outstanding performance; Slater was a late withdrawn from the Storm's round 2 clash against the Titans and after having an arthroscope, he was then later again ruled out for 6–8 months as well as for the season; after pulling up sore following the Storm's victory over the Dragons. With speculations surrounding his playing future following that shoulder reconstruction, his Melbourne Storm Fullback role was filled again by Cameron Munster.

During his time on the sideline, his Fullback positions was filled by Darius Boyd for both Australia (during the International Trans-Tasman ANZAC Test match, which was played at Newcastle's Hunter Stadium) and Queensland (for the State of Origin Series). Despite still being out of action, he missed being part of Queensland's State of Origin victorious campaign although he worked closely with new Maroons coach Kevin Walters as a consultant during the 2016 State of Origin series period, assisting him in coaching and working with the backs, as well as working closely with the team.

Slater also missed being part of Storm's Grand Final home-away-from-home clash to the Cronulla Sharks
 and Australia's successful Four Nations campaign, as well as missing the first ever Perth International Rugby League Trans-Tasman Test match.

At the end of the 2016 season, Slater was awarded (and received) the Peter Jackson Medal for his outstanding contribution in assisting Kevin Walters with the coaching during the 2016 State of Origin series for Queensland.

2017
Slater was set to return to action in the Storm's trial match clash against the Canterbury-Bankstown Bulldogs at North Hobart Oval in Hobart, Tasmania. However, coach Craig Bellamy opted to rest him for the opening 2 rounds of the 2017 season and Slater had to wait until round 3 to returning to action. In Round 3, Slater made his successful return against the Brisbane Broncos at AAMI Park, starting from the bench and playing for 52 minutes in the Storm's 14–12 win. The following week, he started at Fullback in the Storm's 22–14 win over the West Tigers playing 80 minutes at Leichhardt Oval, which was his first full-game and away game.

In Round 9, Slater finally broke his long try-scoring drought by scoring 2 tries in a strong man-of-the-match performance in the Storm's 34–22 win over the Dragons. This was the first time he scored a double of tries, since round 9 of the 2015 season. Despite playing consistently well since coming back from injury; Slater was left out of the Australian Kangaroos Test Squad for the International Trans-Tasman ANZAC Test match to New Zealand, with coach Mal Meninga opted to stay loyal and stick with Darius Boyd at Fullback, as well as the players who were part of last year's successful Four Nations Campaign.

Playing his first game in his home state of Queensland in over 1000 days and since round 4 of the 2015 season (which was against the Cowboys at 1300SMILES Stadium in Townsville) in the NRL Indigenous Round and the Round 10 double-header at Suncorp Stadium; Slater continued his consistent form by producing an outstanding performance scoring a try, setting-up 2 tries, making 8 tackles, 16 runs (174 metres), 2 line-breaks and a line-break assist; despite the Storm narrowly losing 36–38 to the Titans. This was also his first game playing at Suncorp Stadium, since round 20 of the 2014 Season which was against the Brisbane Broncos; despite missing Game 3 (the decider) of the 2015 State of Origin series and last year's Game 2 of the 2016 State of Origin series.

With Greg Inglis already sidelined and ruled out of the season with a season-ending knee injury, Slater was expected to return to the Queensland Squad for the 2017 State of Origin series. Despite this, coach Kevin Walters opted to stick with Darius Boyd at Fullback, keep Justin O'Neill at right centre, Corey Oates at left wing, Dane Gagai at right wing and bring in Will Chambers to play left centre; which resulted him being controversially left out of the Game 1 Squad. Following Queensland's Origin Game 1 loss to New South Wales, Slater continued-on with his outstanding consistent performances helping the Storm to victories over the Knights and Sharks. He was then recalled to the Queensland squad along with Johnathan Thurston for game 2, which resulted incumbent Australian Test Fullback Darius Boyd shifting to Centre and Justin O'Neill dropped from the team.

In Game 2 of the Origin Series, Slater produced an outstanding performance setting-up 2 tries (the first try of the game to debutant left winger Valentine Holmes, when he combined with Johnathan Thurston and Darius Boyd; and the game-winning try to right winger Dane Gagai, when he combined with Michael Morgan leading-up to Johnathan Thurston kicking that winning conversion goal) helping QLD to level the series margin to 1-all in the 18–16 win over NSW at ANZ Stadium. Slater remained in the team for game 3 and he produced another outstanding performance in the decider, combining with Storm teammates Cameron Smith, Cooper Cronk and Cameron Munster in QLD's NRL one-club spine combination; to guide QLD to a series win in the 22–6 victory over NSW at Suncorp Stadium.

Playing his first NRL final series appearance since 2014 (despite missing the 2015 and 2016 play-offs due to shoulder injuries) and during the first week of the NRL play-offs final series; Slater played a key part in his side's 18–16 win over the Parramatta Eels at AAMI Park, scoring a try (his 180th NRL career try) in the 2nd half of the game which resulted him drawing level to former Manly Sea Eagles player Steve Menzies as the game's all-time second-equal highest top try-scorer.

With the Storm fresh off their break (after Week 2 of the NRL Final Series) and after their 18–16 victory over the Parramatta Eels (in the first week of the Final Series), Slater featured in the club's Grand Final qualifier match against the Brisbane Broncos scoring 2 tries (both in the second half – the 59th minute and in the 71st minute) in the 30–0 win, allowing the Storm progressing through to the Grand Final and resulted him to move past Steve Menzies as the game's stand-alone second highest top try-scorer (behind another former Manly Sea Eagles player Ken Irvine, who had scored 212 tries).

On 27 September leading into the Grand Final; Slater was awarded the Fullback of the Year Award at the NRL Dally M Awards Event.

Playing in the Grand Final at ANZ Stadium on 1 October; Slater produced an outstanding performance guiding the Melbourne Storm to win the 2017 NRL Premiership (their first Premiership since 2012), beating the North Queensland Cowboys 34–6. Following the game, he received the Clive Churchill Medal as the best player on the field. Two days following the Grand Final victory, Slater was named in the Australian Test Squad for the 2017 Rugby League World Cup Tournament. He also signed a one-year extension, committing to the Melbourne Storm for the 2018 season.

Playing at Fullback in his first international test match for Australia since 2014, Slater scored a try and produced an outstanding man-of-the-match performance in the 18–4 win over England at Melbourne's AAMI Park. The following week, he equaled the record of Bob Fulton and Jarryd Hayne in becoming the Tournament's Top Try-Scorer in Rugby League World Cup history by producing another outstanding performance and scoring his 13th World Cup try (his 24th Test-Career Try) in Australia's 52–6 win over France in Canberra. Coach Mal Meninga opted to rest Slater for the Lebanon clash in Sydney, leading into the play-offs. Slater then returned to the starting line-up at Fullback for the quarter-final game, scoring a try in Australia's 46–0 win against Samoa in Darwin. He then played in Australia's semi-final game against Fiji, scoring 2 tries (which resulted him breaking the all-time World Cup Try-Scoring Record; scoring his 16th World Cup try, as well as his 27th Test try) in the 52–6 win at Suncorp Stadium, guiding the Australians to the World Cup Grand Final. Playing Fullback in the World Cup Grand Final at Suncorp Stadium, Slater featured in Australia's 6–0 win over England, playing an important role and producing another fine performance in the green-and-gold jersey.

2018
Slater started the season, sitting out of the Round 1 game (to the Bulldogs in Perth) due to injury. He returned to the field in Round 2, playing his 300th NRL Career game in the 8–10 loss the West Tigers at AAMI Park.

Slater earned criticism during a home Round 6 game against the Newcastle Knights where he was accused of diving which led second-rower Lachlan Fitzgibbon to be sin-binned. While Slater had the right to go for a quick-tap because he was outside the 10-metre, many disapproved when Fitzgibbon stuck out his hand out on shoulder lightly to make Slater hit the deck. Both fans and social media users were questioning the physics of Slater falling, thus drawing accusations of diving.

Slater also captained the Melbourne Storm for the first time in his NRL Career and during Cameron Smith's suspension absence, against the Manly Sea Eagles in the 4–24 loss during Round 11.

Slater announced his intentions to retire from representative football after the 2018 State of Origin series and was yet to make a decision on playing only at the club level in 2019.

Slater was set to play in the opening game of the Origin series at the MCG; however, he withdrew from the Game 1 squad due to a hamstring injury, in what would have been his last Origin match in Melbourne. He returned from injury in game 2 to play his 30th Origin game, producing an outstanding performance despite Queensland losing game 2 and the series in New South Wales' home game victory at ANZ Stadium.

Following an injury to Queensland teammate and captain Greg Inglis, Slater was named captain for game 3 in his final Origin game. Producing yet another outstanding performance, Slater led Queensland to an 18–12 victory at Suncorp Stadium, thus avoiding a potential 3–0 series whitewash by New South Wales. For his efforts, Slater received the Wally Lewis Medal for Player of the Series, despite having only participated in two of the three Origin games and Queensland's overall series loss.

On 8 August, Slater announced that he would be retiring from the NRL at the end of the 2018 season. He played his final game, a grand final loss to the Sydney Roosters, on 30 September 2018.

Post-playing career
On 10 October 2018, Slater joined Australian Football League (AFL) club  in a leadership role. He also joined the Nine Network’s NRL commentary team in 2019 On 14 March 2019 Melbourne Storm Announced the renaming of the Northern Stand of AAMI Park to Slater Stand. On 30 August 2019, Slater was chosen at Fullback in the Queensland Maroons team of the decade. Billy was recently selected as the Queensland Maroons Head Coach on 24 September 2021 on a two-year deal.

Honours

Individual
 1x Dally M Medal Player of the Year: 2011 :
 1x Rugby League World Golden Boot Award: 2008
 3x Dally M Fullback of the Year: 2008, 2011, 2017
 2x Wally Lewis Medal (State of Origin): 2010, 2018
 2x Clive Churchill Medal: 2009, 2017
 1x Melbourne Storm Player of the Year Award: 2009
 1x Rugby League World Cup Player of the Tournament: 2008
 1x Dally M Top Try Scorer: 2005 (19, tied with Shaun Berrigan)
 1x Rugby League World Cup Top Try Scorer: 2008 (7)
 Melbourne Storm Team of the Decade (Fullback): 2007

Team
 2x NRL Grand Final Winners: 2012, 2017
 2x NRL Grand Final Winners – Stripped: 2007, 2009
 4x Minor Premiership (J. J. Giltinan Shield): 2011, 2016, 2017, 2019
 3x Minor Premiership (J. J. Giltinan Shield) – Stripped: 2006, 2007, 2008
 4x NRL Grand Final Runner-Up: 2006, 2008, 2016, 2018
 3x World Club Challenge Winners: 2010, 2013, 2018
 8x State of Origin Winners (Queensland): 2008, 2009, 2010, 2011, 2012, 2013, 2015, 2017
 2x Rugby League World Cup Winners: 2013, 2017
 1x Rugby League World Cup Runner-up: 2008
 2x Rugby League Four Nations Winners: 2009, 2011
 1x Rugby League Four Nations Runner-up: 2010
 1x World Club Challenge Runner-up: 2008

Statistics

NRL

State of Origin

Australia

Personal life
Slater lives in Melbourne with his wife, Nicole Slater (née Rose). They were married in Cairns in November 2009 and have two children, a daughter, Tyla Rose and a son, Jake.

Billy Slater participated in the television show Australia's Greatest Athlete and was the winner for both Season 1 (broadcast on Channel 9) and Season 2 (on Channel 7) against a diverse range of athletes such as Olympic gold medalist Steve Hooker, ironman Ky Hurst and V8 Supercar champions Jamie Whincup and Craig Lowndes.

A regular contributor to Canterbury Junior Football Club in Melbourne, Slater also frequently gives up his time to help other Junior Sport Programs around Australia.

See also

List of players with 100 NRL tries

References

External links

Melbourne Storm profile
Storm profile
2017 RLWC profile

1983 births
Living people
Australia national rugby league team players
Australian rugby league commentators
Australian rugby league players
Clive Churchill Medal winners
Melbourne Storm players
North Sydney Bears NSW Cup players
Norths Devils players
Queensland Rugby League State of Origin captains
Queensland Rugby League State of Origin coaches
Queensland Rugby League State of Origin players
Rugby league fullbacks
Rugby league players from Nambour, Queensland
Rugby league wingers